Craswall Priory was a Grandmontine priory in Herefordshire, England at  dating from 1220 to 1225. The poor condition of the ruins mean that they are on Historic England's Heritage at Risk Register.

References

External links
 The History of Ewyas Lacy: The Priory and Manor of Craswall
 The History of Ewyas Lacy: Craswall Priory (Order of Grandmont) architecture, construction and history
 Historic England: Craswall Priory, Craswall, Herefordshire
 Historic England: Craswall Priory, associated building remains, pond bays and hollow ways

Monasteries in Herefordshire
Scheduled monuments in Herefordshire